Kaysville is a city in Davis County, Utah. It is part of the Ogden–Clearfield metropolitan area. The population was 27,300 at the time of the 2010 census, with an estimated population of 32,390 in 2019.

History

Shortly after Latter Day Saint pioneers arrived in 1847, the Kaysville area, originally known as "Kay's Creek" or Kay's Ward, was settled by Hector Haight in 1850 as a farming community. He had been sent north to find feed for the stock and soon thereafter constructed a cabin and brought his family to settle the area. Farmington, Utah also claims Hector Haight as its original settler. Two miles north of Haight's original settlement, Samuel Holmes built a cabin in 1849 and was soon joined by other settlers from Salt Lake, namely Edward Phillips, John Green, and William Kay.

Although settlement began in the 1840s, the name of Kaysville connects with the fact that in 1851 William Kay was made the bishop in the vicinity by Brigham Young and Heber C. Kimball.

After the move south in 1858 (see Utah War), there was an attempt to rename the community "Freedom", but Brigham Young convinced the residents to retain the old name.

In 1868 Kaysville became the first city incorporated in Davis County.

An adobe meetinghouse was built in 1863. It was replaced by the Kaysville Tabernacle in 1914. In 1930 Kaysville had 992 people. Of those residents who were Latter-Day Saints, they all were in the Kaysville Ward which also covered most of the rest of the Kaysville Precinct.

In 1977 United Airlines Flight 2860 crashed near Kaysville.

By 2008 there were seven Mormon stakes (similar to a diocese) in Kaysville.

In November 2009, Kaysville voters elected Steve Hiatt as Kaysville City's 38th mayor and the youngest mayor in Utah. He was sworn in on January 4, 2010. He was re-elected for a second four-year term in November 2013.

The current mayor, Tamara Tran, won the 2021 election with 59.95 percent of the popular vote over Jay Welk.

Geography
Kaysville is bordered by the city of Layton to the north, Fruit Heights to the east, and Farmington, the county seat, to the south.

Demographics

As of the census of 2000, there were 20,351 people, 5,496 households, and 4,814 families residing in the city. The population density was 2,016.1 people per square mile (778.7/km2). There were 5,638 housing units at an average density of 558.5 per square mile (215.7/km2). The racial makeup of the city was 96.57% White, 0.31% African American, 0.28% Native American, 0.66% Asian, 0.18% Pacific Islander, 0.90% from other races, and 1.10% from two or more races. Hispanic or Latino people of any race were 2.98% of the population.

There were 5,496 households, out of which 57.5% had children under 18 living with them, 77.6% were married couples living together, 8.0% had a female householder with no husband present, and 12.4% were non-families. 11.1% of all households were made up of individuals, and 5.8% had someone living alone who was 65 years of age or older. The average household size was 3.69, and the average family size was 4.02.

The city's population was spread out, with 40.6% under 18, 9.7% from 18 to 24, 27.2% from 25 to 44, 15.7% from 45 to 64, and 6.8% who were 65 years of age or older. The median age was 25 years. For every 100 females, there were 99.2 males. For every 100 females aged 18 and over, there were 92.7 males.

The median income for a household in the city was $60,383, and the median income for a family was $64,818. Males had a median income of $50,414 versus $27,653 for females. The per capita income for the city was $17,652. About 4.2% of families and 4.7% of the population were below the poverty line, including 5.6% of those under age 18 and 6.8% of those aged 65 or over.

Points of interest 
 Cherry Hill (amusement park)
 Davis High School
 House where John Taylor died
 LeConte Stewart Artist Museum
 Utah Botanical Center
 Kay's Cross

Notable people
 Rob Bishop, congressman
 Henry H. Blood, seventh governor of Utah
 James Cowser, former player for Oakland Raiders
 Floyd Gottfredson, cartoonist in the Will Eisner Award Hall of Fame
 Jared Ward, Olympic marathon runner

References

External links

 City of Kaysville official website

Cities in Utah
Cities in Davis County, Utah
Populated places established in 1850
Ogden–Clearfield metropolitan area
1850 establishments in Utah Territory